Test Site was an art installation, that was displayed in the turbine hall of Tate Modern in London, UK, between October 2006 and 9 April 2007. Test Site was designed like Carsten Höller, and was the seventh commission of the series of works in the turbine hall sponsored by Unilever known as "The Unilever Series".

The exhibit consisted of a series of metal slides. There were a total of five slides, two starting on the second floor, and one on each floor after that up to the 5th floor. The slides were composed of metal and fibreglass, and covered all the way around.

Visitors could slide down the slides of the installation free, but timed entry tickets were required for all but the second floor slides.

References

External links
The Unilever Series: Carsten Höller from Tate Online

Tate galleries
2006 sculptures
Installation art works